Philip Hubbard may refer to:

 P. M. Hubbard (1910–1980), British writer
 Philip G. Hubbard (1921–2002), African American university professor and administrator
 Phil Hubbard (born 1956), American former basketball player
 Phil Hubbard (footballer) (born 1949), English former footballer
 Phil Hubbard (academic) (born 1969), British geographer and sociologist